The men's football tournament at the 1984 South Asian Games was held from 18 to 21 September 1981 in Kathmandu, Nepal. 

Nepal won the tournament by defeating Bangladesh in the final.

Participating nations

Group stage

All the results entered are same as found in

Group stage
<noinclude>

Gold-medal match

Winners

References

1984 South Asian Games
1984 South Asian Games